Telopea Park School is a government international primary and secondary school in Canberra, Australia. It is named after the adjacent Telopea Park. It was founded in 1923, making it the oldest school in Canberra. Telopea Park School is one of the few public schools in the Australian Capital Territory to teach students from Kindergarten to Year 10 and is the only bi-national school in Canberra. Recognised in a treaty, it is fully accredited by the French Ministry of Education and offers a bilingual program from Kindergarten to Year 10. It is also one of two high schools in the ACT to be part of the International Baccalaureate Middle Years Programme, having gained IB membership in 2006.

The school buildings have been heritage-listed by the ACT Heritage Council.

Primary school

One half of the school's buildings has been allocated to the primary section of Telopea Park School. All of the students in primary at Telopea Park School follow a bilingual education, with 80% of the lessons from Kindergarten to Year 2 given in French by teachers recognised by both the French Education department and the ACT Department of Education. In Years 3 to 6, French and English is taught as a 50/50 ratio. French staff are generally contracted for 2 to 3 years. They arrive and depart mid-year in accordance with Northern Hemisphere schooling. Students also have classes given in English by Australian staff to complement their French language education.

Secondary school 

The secondary school is not exclusively English speaking. The English/French Stream (EFS) allows students to continue their education in French. It follows the French education system while incorporating three compulsory ACT courses. The other students, who form about two-thirds of the student body, follow the ACT secondary school system and can then complete the International Baccalaureate Organisation Middle Years Program. Most students from Telopea Park School go on to Narrabundah College, the EFS in particular as Narrabundah College is the only college in Canberra (and one of only two schools in Australia) to allow students to sit the French Baccalauréat.

Languages 
During Years 7 to 10, learning a language other than English is compulsory at Telopea park school, unlike most other ACT secondary schools. Students usually study a single language for all four years. However, sometimes beginner classes are started for new students to the school in years 9 and 10. Students choose between Spanish, Italian, German, Japanese, Indonesian, and French. As of 2017 Mandarin was introduced to the school, making a total of 7 languages. Students follow three hours of language classes a week.

The English/French Stream 

The English/French Stream (EFS) is essentially a portion of students at Telopea High School who follow a different system and curriculum to those of the English Stream (who follow the standard ACT system and curriculum). These students are usually those who follow on from Telopea Park Primary School. The way the EFS students learn is very different from that of the students of the English Stream: EFS students have fewer elective classes, as they have compulsory History and Geography every term, and they learn three languages instead of two (English, French, and a third language). The current principal is Jason Holmes. In July 2015, an alumni association (alfac) was created by Isabelle Mellor and Emilie Texier for the former students of the English/French stream. The association was officially launched in August 2015 at the French embassy in Canberra, and since then the community has been expanding quickly.

The EFS has a different timetable and also has its own principal (la proviseure) currently Florence Llopis. After the EFS students finish at Telopea, they continue the EFS French Baccalaureat at Narrabundah College in years 11 and 12.

To underline the equal importance of the French and Australian streams, both national anthems are played at the beginning of the school assembly which is on every other Friday.

Notable alumni
 Kofi Danning, soccer player, for a number of teams in the A-League
 Leon Ford, Australian actor
 Cariba Heine, Australian actress
 Alex Jesaulenko, Australian Rules player
 Caroline Le Couteur, Australian politician
 Matthew Le Nevez, Australian actor
 Malcolm McIntosh, Australian public servant
 Steve Mauger, Australian politician
 Patricia Piccinini, Australian visual artist
 Nikolai Topor-Stanley, soccer player, former captain of Western Sydney Wanderers in the A-League
 Gough Whitlam, former Australian Prime Minister

See also

French Australian
Narrabundah College

References

External links

 Official site
 Lycée Franco Australien de Canberra - English French stream

Public schools in the Australian Capital Territory
High schools in the Australian Capital Territory
French international schools in Australia
Australian Capital Territory Heritage Register